Nickiesha Wilson (born 28 July 1986 in Kingston) is a hurdler from Jamaica. She competes in the 100 m hurdles and the 400 m hurdles.

Currently her 100 m hurdles personal best is 12.79 achieved at Szczecin, Poland in 2009. She ran a personal best of 53.97 in the 400 m hurdles in Osaka in 2007.

Wilson finished fourth in the 2007 World Championships in the 400 metres hurdles. She competed in the 400 metres hurdles at the 2008 Beijing Olympics where she qualified for the second round with the tenth fastest overall time of 55.75 seconds. In the 2010 Commonwealth Games, she won the bronze medal in 400 m hurdles.

Wilson is the most prolific hurdler in NCAA history.  A 17 time college All-American and 3-time NCAA Champion at Louisiana State University (LSU), Wilson is the only hurdler in NCAA history to win the 400 meter hurdles (pr 53.97) and finish runner up in the 100 meter hurdles (pr 12.85) in the same year while also posting a top 5 finish in the indoor 60 meter hurdles (pr 8.01). Wilson led LSU to the outdoor NCAA team title by scoring 18 individual points for the Tigers. In the summer of 2008, Wilson opted to forgo her senior season at LSU to sign a professional contract with Adidas

Personal bests

International competitions

References

External links

1986 births
Living people
Jamaican female hurdlers
Sportspeople from Kingston, Jamaica
Olympic athletes of Jamaica
Athletes (track and field) at the 2008 Summer Olympics
Athletes (track and field) at the 2012 Summer Olympics
Athletes (track and field) at the 2016 Summer Olympics
Pan American Games medalists in athletics (track and field)
Athletes (track and field) at the 2007 Pan American Games
Commonwealth Games medallists in athletics
Athletes (track and field) at the 2010 Commonwealth Games
World Athletics Championships athletes for Jamaica
LSU Lady Tigers track and field athletes
Pan American Games silver medalists for Jamaica
Commonwealth Games bronze medallists for Jamaica
Central American and Caribbean Games gold medalists for Jamaica
Competitors at the 2010 Central American and Caribbean Games
IAAF Continental Cup winners
Central American and Caribbean Games medalists in athletics
Medalists at the 2007 Pan American Games
Jamaican expatriate sportspeople in the United States
Medallists at the 2010 Commonwealth Games